Beautiful Assassin is a historical fiction novel by Michael C. White. The book focuses on Lieutenant Tat'yana Levchenko, whose husband goes missing and daughter is killed, inspiring her to become a soldier. After becoming a Soviet hero for killing over 300 Germans, she is wounded in battle and while recovering is asked to come to the United States at the request of First Lady Eleanor Roosevelt to promote the war effort.

Plot

The novel centers on Lieutenant Tat'yana Levchenko, who decides to join the Soviet Army as a sniper after her husband, Nikolai Grigorovich (who is known as Koyla by "those few friends he had") goes missing in action and her daughter, Masha, is killed by Germans in their hometown of Kiev, Ukraine. After Masha's death, Tat'yana desires to become a soldier and boards a train filled with recruits. As she and the recruits change into military gear and uniforms on the train, while some make lewd comments at her, Tat'yana is one of the first to acknowledge that she can fire a gun when asked by a political officer. After killing a cow in a farmer's field, the officer smiles and tells her to "Do the same with the Germans."  (page 248) During the Siege of Sevastopol, Tat'yana becomes a Soviet hero when she kills a confirmed 300 Germans, including one called the "King of Death."  After being wounded in action (which requires a hysterectomy), Tat'yana is evacuated from the front and while recovering from her injuries is presented with the Gold Star medal, is honored a Hero of the Soviet Union, and receives many letters thank her for her service and bravery.

Tat'yana's fame grows to the point that Eleanor Roosevelt, First Lady of the United States, hears of her actions and invites her to America. While in America, Tat'yana becomes friends with Mrs. Roosevelt, along with her interpreter Captain Jack Taylor (real name Charles Pierce), and becomes an unwilling pawn in the efforts of her handler Vasilyev, who wants Tat'yana to get close to the first lady in the hopes of uncovering President Franklin D. Roosevelt's war intentions. Forced to question the motives of her handler and even her translator and must make the decision of whether to remain in the United States or return to the Soviet Union, then she mysteriously disappears.

In the book's epilogue, many decades after her disappearance, an elderly Tat'yana is tracked down by a journalist who revealed her story of her wanting to marry Captain Taylor (who died in a plane crash before the end of the war), learning from him about a Soviet spy network in the United States, a letter from Mrs. Roosevelt after President Roosevelt's death, a photo of Tat'yana and her family, and the log she recorded her kills in. The novel ends with the journalist, whose name is Elizabeth, revealing that she and her husband adopted a Russian girl named Raisa, who Tat'yana remembered rescuing from the Germans in the sewers of Sevastopol during her time as a sniper, but had no knowledge of what happened to her after the war.

Characters
Lieutenant Tat'yana Levchenko: Russian sniper who becomes famous for killing a confirmed 300 Germans (often exaggerated for publicity) at the Battle of Sevastopol

Nikolai (Koyla) and Masha: Tat'yana's husband and daughter. Koyla is serving country when he goes missing and is presumed dead, but later is revealed to be recovering in a hospital. Masha was killed in front of her mother, leading Tat'yana to want to take a direct role in the war against Germany.

Vasilyev: Tat'yana's handler during her tour of the United States

Captain Jack Taylor (real name Charles Pierce): Tat'yana's interpreter, who she later falls in love with and decides to defect to the United States

Eleanor Roosevelt: First Lady of the United States from 1933 to 1945

Raisa: Girl rescued during the Battle of Sevastopol and later adopted by the reporter Elizabeth

Elizabeth: Journalist who interviews an elderly Tat'yana at the end of the novel

Major themes
World War 1939-1945—Fiction, Women Spies—Fiction, Snipers—Fiction, Russians—United States—Fiction

Development history
Michael Whites' explanation of the story of Beautiful Assassin  on Harper Collins Publishers website:

"I am heavily invested in two projects right now.

The first is a novel called Beautiful Assassin, about a female sniper in WWII. Tat'yana Levchenko is the most decorated sniper in the Russian Army in 1942, with a record 300 confirmed kills of German soldiers. She is a national hero in the darkest days of the war—so famous, in fact, that Eleanor Roosevelt hears of her and invites her to come to the United States. And whether she wants to go or not, she is sent to America. Her stated mission is to build support for the Russian war effort, though she would prefer to fight on with her comrades at the front. While in America she becomes friends with Mrs. Roosevelt as well as with the First Lady's interpreter, Lieutenant Taylor. She finds America and its people both fascinating and frustrating, with a wealth of freedom  and material success but spoiled and self-absorbed, especially at a time when the world is at war and her own country is losing tens of thousands to the German war machine. She also finds herself an unwilling pawn at the mercy of her Soviet handlers who have more sinister plans than just supporting the war effort.

Guarded by NKVD agents, Tat'yana mysteriously disappears on her tour in America, and her death in a plane crash is reported. It will be 50 years before the real story is revealed and the mystery of Tat'yana solved.

The story is loosely based on an actual female Soviet soldier, Lyudmila Pavlichenko. I've fictionalized her character and am telling the story from her own point of view. Tat'yana is an amazing woman for her time or for ours—strong, brave, intelligent, loyal, and sensitive. I find her to be a remarkable woman in a remarkable time.

My second project is acting as Program Director for Fairfield University's (CT) new low-residency MFA in Creative Writing. Our first residency begins this December on Enders Island, off the coast of Mystic, Connecticut, and I am busy gathering a great stable of writers to teach in the program. This is an exciting project for me, because when I'm not writing, I am a teacher and I am as passionate about teaching creative writing as I am about my own writing."

http://www.harpercollins.com/author/microsite/books.aspx?authorid=10507

Publication history
2010, USA, William Morrow,  Pub date 30 March 2010, Hardcover
2011, USA, Harper Perennial,  Pub date 22 March 2011, Paperback

Explanation of the novel's title

The name Beautiful Assassin is explained on page 155:

"Over the next several days, Vasilyev would pick me up and show me about the city as if it were his own private amusement park. During the day we visited museums and art galleries and historical sites, while in the evening we attended elegant dinners or went to the theater or to the Bolshoi, where there were always crowds eager to see me. Before one ballet performance, I was asked to come onstage, where I received a bouquet of flowers from a ballerina in a tutu. Beside her, I felt clumsy an unfeminine in my uniform and heavy boots. Nonetheless, I received a standing ovation from the crowd. Wherever we went, Vasilyev paraded me around, often introducing me by some clever pet name--the Ukrainian Lion or the Queen of Fire. But his favorite was Krasavitsa Ubiytsa, which translated roughly to "Beautiful Assassin," a title that he was quite proud of having coined and one that I wouldn't be able to shake. One time, we showed up where a large group of people had gathered in the street. It was below Vorobyovy Gory. A small military band composed of old men was playing some marital theme. It turned out they were name a street after me--ulitsa Levchenko. I toured hospitals, where I shook hands with wounded vets, and old people's homes and spoke to groups of schoolchildren. They had me go on the radio and tell of my experiences, though not before Vasilyev had coached me to "sound positive," to put our war effort in good light."

Reception

From Harper Collins Publishers website:

A breathtaking tale of love, loyalty, and intrigue set in the early days of World War II from the acclaimed New York Times Notable Book author of Soul Catcher, which USA Today hailed as "a marvelous historical novel"

“Michael White is a wonderful storyteller, and his work is long on atmosphere, and packed with action.”
—Kevin Baker, author of Paradise Alley

“It has been occupying most of my free moments for the past several days.... Painstakingly researched, relentlessly paced, Beautiful Assassin is a book you will not put down easily, and one that will resonate well past the closing pages.”
— BookPage.com

From Michael White's personal website:

“This is a superb 1940s drama... a winner that condemns nations for their expendable deployment of individuals.”
Harriet Klausner

"It is rare to find a work of historical fiction that can so intricately weave fact and fiction into a fantastic story. We follow Soviet sniper Tat'yana Levchenko from the Eastern Front of World War II to the United States as she tours with Eleanor Roosevelt, embarking on a journey of mystery and intrigue and revealing the shaky alliance between the Soviet Union and the United States."
Zachary Schwarz, Indie Next List, April '10

External links

Michael White's website
Harper Collins list of books by Michael White
Beautiful Assassin on Amazon.com

2010 American novels
American historical novels
William Morrow and Company books